Galija  is a Serbian and Yugoslav rock band formed in Niš in 1977.

The central figures of the band are brothers Nenad Milosavljević (vocals, acoustic guitar and harmonica) and Predrag Milosavljević (vocals). A large numbrer of musicians passed through the band, with Milosavljević brothers and drummer Boban Pavlović being the only mainstay members. The band's first several releases were progressive rock-oriented, bringing them a loyal fanbase, but in the mid-1980s the band moved towards more mainstream-oriented sound. In the mid-1980s, the band was joined by guitarist Jean Jacques Roskam and multi-instrumentalist Bratislav "Bata" Zlatković. This lineup of the band cooperated with poet Radoman Kanjevac on the album trilogy consisting of Daleko je Sunce (1988), Korak do slobode (1989) and Istorija, ti i ja (1991), which featured provocative political-related lyrics and with which they achieved huge mainstream popularity. The band managed to sustain their popularity throughout the 1990s, but went on a hiatus at the end of the decade. Since their return to the scene in the mid-2000s, the band remains one of the top mainstream acts of the Serbian rock scene.

Band history

1977–1984: progressive rock years
Galija frontman Nenad Milosavljević started performing as a singer-songwriter while still in his teenage years. Influenced by the hippie movement, he performed his songs playing acoustic guitar and harmonica. He had his first public appearance in 1975, on the Evening of Poetry and Music at the Niš Film Festival, performing his own songs and songs by José Feliciano. The performance brought him the attention of the press. In 1976 he performed at the Subotica Youth Festival and Belgrade Spring Festival. At the time, the popular acoustic rock band Lutajuća Srca included the song "Ta je ulica meni znana" ("That Street is Known to Me"), composed by Milosavljević, into their repertoire, which brought him new media attention. He composed music for plays by the Niš Puppet Theatre, the Niš Student Theatre and the Niš Youth Theatre and the amateur theatre Treća polovina (Third Half).

On 11 April 1977 Nenad Milosavljević held a concert in the Niš National Theatre, on which he was accompanied by the members of the band Dva Lustera (Two Chandeliers). After the concert, Milosavljević and Dva Lustera members agreed to start working together as a band. They chose to name the band Galija after the famous kafana in Niš, a gathering place for Niš rockers. The first lineup of Galija featured Nenad Milosavljević (guitar and vocals), Goran Ljubisavljević (guitar), Predrag Branković (bass guitar), Nenad Tančić (drums) and Branislav Stamenković (keyboards). Tančić soon left the band because of his mandatory stint in the Yugoslav army, and was replaced by Boban Pavlović, who would, during the following years, remain one of rare permanent members of the band. Initially, in addition to their own songs the band performed covers of songs by The Rolling Stones, Eagles, Pink Floyd, Genesis and other foreign acts. In 1978, with the new keyboard player, Zoran Stanković, Galija won the first place at the Gitarijada festival in Zaječar. At that time they used to appear on stage in 18th century uniforms. Several months after Gitarijada, they performed at the Subotica Youth Festival with Ljubodrag Vukadinović playing the keyboards. During 1978 they performed as the opening band on Smak tour, and at the end of the year they performed at the BOOM Festival in Novi Sad.

In 1979 the band released their debut album Prva plovidba (The First Sail) through PGP-RTB record label to mixed reviews by the critics. However, the tracks "Avanturista" ("Adventurer"), "Gospi" ("To the Lady") and "Decimen" became first hits for the band. Nenad Milosvaljević's brother Predrag Milosavljević appeared on the album on vocals as a guest musician, and also wrote most of the album lyrics. The band went on a promotional tour, during which they performed in Niš on the amphitheater in the Niš Fortress, the concert featuring a chamber music choir. In 1979 the band also appeared on Bijelo Dugme's Rock Spectacle on JNA Stadium, on which they performed alongside Bijelo Dugme, Kako, Mama Rock, Formula 4, Aerodrom, Opus, Senad od Bosne, Boomerang, Prva Ljubav, Prljavo Kazalište, Tomaž Domicelj, Metak, Suncokret, Parni Valjak, Generacija 5, Siluete and other acts. After the festival, Ljubisavljević, Branković and Vukadinović left the band. The bass guitarist Zoran Radosavljević, the guitarist Dušan Radivojević and the keyboardist Nebojša Marković became the band's new members.

In 1980 the band released their second album, Druga plovidba (The Second Sail). The album was produced by Gordi guitarist Zlatko Manojlović. The songs were composed by Nenad, and the lyrics were written by Predrag Milosavljević. Druga plovidba was the first Galija album to feature Predrag Milosavljević as the official band member. The band promoted the album in their homecity with a concert in Čair Hall. The concert featured guest appearance by Zlatko Manojlović. During the summer Galija performed in Makarska on the Adriatic shore; during the following years they would continue to hold regular concerts in the town. During the same year the band performed at the Split Festival, playing at Poljud Stadium with Azra, Metak, Drago Mlinarec, Generacija 5, Senad od Bosne, Aerodrom, Dado Topić and other acts. In Zenica the band performed on the Bilino Polje Stadium, alongside Riblja Čorba, Maja Odžaklievska, Davorin Popović, Aerodrom, YU Grupa and Vatreni Poljubac, on a concert organized as a celebration of Radio Zenica 11th anniversary. At this time Galija achieved huge success with the audience in Bosnia and Herzegovina, and until the beginning of Yugoslav wars the band had the biggest fanbase in Bosnia. The Yugoslav press, although mostly critical of the band's second album, praised their concerts, especially Nenad Milosavljević's charismatic on-stage appearance. In 1980 Pavlović left the band to serve his stint in the Yugoslav Army, and was replaced by Zoran Stamenković. In 1981 the band performed, alongside Pomaranča, Tunel, Radomir Mihajlović Točak Trio, Piloti, Bulevar, Siluete and other acts, at the second edition of Belgrade Rock Festival in Pionir Hall in front of some 10,000 people.

In 1982, the album Ipak verujem u sebe (Nevertheless, I Believe in Myself) was released, bringing hits "Još uvek sanjam" ("I'm Still Dreaming") and "Burna pijana noć" ("Stormy Drunken Night"). The album was recorded with new guitarist, Branislav Radulović. At the beginning of 1982, Boban Pavlović returned to the band. In 1982 Galija performed as the opening band at Joe Cocker's concert in Pionir Hall in Belgrade. At the beginning of 1983 they toured Bosnia and Herzegovina with YU Grupa and Buldožer, and on 10 June 1983 they held a big concert at Belgrade's Tašmajdan Stadium with Potop (The Flood) and Kerber as the opening bands. Potop leader, keyboardist Saša Lokner, soon became Galija's new keyboardist.

1984–1988: shift to mainstream rock
In October 1983 Galija recorded their fourth studio album Bez naglih skokova (Without Bounces), which marked the band's shift away from progressive rock towards more mainstream-oriented sound.. The album, released in 1984, was recorded in Manchester and was produced by Nightwing bass guitarist Gordon Rowley (who previously worked with another band from Niš, Kerber), and mixed in California. The material was offered to record label Jugoton, but the label refused the material, so the band once again signed with PGP-RTB. Unlike the band's previous releases, Bez naglih skokova did not bring any hits. After the album release, the band performed, together with Bajaga i Instruktori, Laboratorija Zvuka and Leb i Sol, on a fundraising concert in Sarajevo, dedicated to the victims of the 1983 Kopaonik earthquake. At the end of 1984, Galija were voted "The Best Live Act on the Shore" by Split youth. During the year, the band started to hold regular concerts in Music Club 81 in Niš, on which they performed covers of foreign rock hits. During the same year, Lokner joined Bajaga i Instruktori, and was replaced by Aleksandar Ralev. Jean Jacques Roskam, a Belgian of Zaire origin, soon joined Galija as the lead guitarist. Roskam previously played in the Belgian band Machiavel and in the Yugoslav groups D' Boys and Peđa D' Boy Band.

In 1986, the band released the album Digni ruku (Raise Your Hand), with the title track becoming a hit. The band wanted the album cover to feature a provocative image of the Hero of Socialist Labour Alija Sirotanović with a blindfold, which the record label refused. The album featured Roskam's song "Winter's Coming", with lyrics written by Dani Klein, the singer of the Belgian band Vaya Con Dios. After the album release, Radulović left the band.

1988–1994: cooperation with Radoman Kanjevac, album trilogy and the peak of popularity

In the late 1980s the band was joined by Bratislav "Bata" Zlatković, a multi-instrumentalist – in Galija he played guitar, keboards and flute – who graduated from Sarajevo Music Academy, and started to work with the lyricist Radoman Kanjevac, the two bringing new ideas. Kanjevac brought up an idea of releasing an album trilogy which would deal with political situation in socialist Yugoslavia at the end of 1980s, and Zlatković introduced folk music influences into Galija's sound. The album Daleko je Sunce (Distant is the Sun), named after Dobrica Ćosić's novel, featured numerous guest musicians: keyboardists Kornelije Kovač and Saša Lokner, bass guitarist Nenad Stefanović "Japanac", drummer Ivan Vdović, Fejat Sejdić Trumpet Orchestra and others. Songs were named after the works of writers Dobrica Ćosić, Branko Ćopić, Ivo Andrić, Laza Lazarević and Aleksa Šantić. Daleko je sunce brought new attention of the media and of the younger audience. The album's biggest hits were the ballad "Da li si spavala" ("Did You Sleep") and the folk-oriented "Mi znamo sudbu" ("We Know the Destiny"). The other hits included "Intimni odnosi" ("Intimate Relationship"), "Orlovi rano lete" ("Eagles Start Flying Early ") and "Kao i obično" ("Like Usual"). The song "Zebre i bizoni" ("Zebras and Buffalos") featured provocative lyrics dealing with Josip Broz Tito's residence at Brijuni. As the record label considered the song politically problematic, "Zebre i bizoni" lyrics were not printed on the inner sleeve. Due to lyrics perceived as politically provocative, the editors of Radio Belgrade and Radio Zagreb marked two songs from Daleko je sunce unsuitable for broadcasting, while the editors of Radio Sarajevo decided not to broadcast four songs from the album. After Daleko je Sunce was released, Zoran Radosavljević left the band, and was replaced by Predrag Milanović.

The second part of the trilogy, Korak do slobode (One Step to Freedom) was released in 1989. The album was produced by Saša Habić. While Daleko je sunce lyrics were written by both Kanjevac and Predrag Milosavljević, the lyrics for Korak do slobode were written by Kanjevac only, much to Predrag Milosavljević's dissatisfaction. The song "Sloboda" ("Freedom") featured Kerber frontman Goran Šepa on vocals. The album hits included "Na tvojim usnama" ("On Your Lips"), "Kopaonik", "Korak do slobode" and "Kad me pogledaš" ("When You Look at Me"). Roskam's reggae song "Ljubavna pesma" ("Love Song") had ironic lyrics dealing with the growing nationalism in Yugoslavia. Korak do slobode saw similarly good reception as Daleko je sunce. During the year, the magazine Pop Rock proclaimed "Na tvojim usnama" the Song of the Year, and Nenad Milosavljević won the Composer of the Year Award at MESAM festival, although Zlatković was the composer of the album's biggest hits. The band promoted the album with a concert in Belgrade Youth Center and an open-air concert in Dušanova Street in Niš in front of some 20,000 people. After these performances, new bass guitarist, Dušan Karadžić, joined Galija. 

At the beginning of 1990 Galija, alongside Yugoslav rock acts Riblja Čorba, Valentino, Viktorija and Bajaga i Instruktori, performed in Timișoara, Romania, at the three-day concerts organized two months after the Romanian Revolution. All five acts performed on three concerts in Timișoara Olympia Hall in front of some 20,000 people each night. During the same year, the compilation album Još uvek sanjam (Najveći hitovi) (I'm Still Dreaming (Greatest Hits)) was released, with some of the old songs re-recorded. At the time of the first multi-party elections in Yugoslavia, Galija, after the idea of Kanjevac and journalist Petar "Peca" Popović, recorded an EP with songs "On je isti kao on" ("He Is just like Him"), "Ti si moja jedina partija" ("You Are My Only Party"), "Posle svega" ("After Everything") and "Komunista" ("Communist", which featured Romani musician Šaban Bajramović on vocals). The EP featured provocative lyrics dealing with the uncertain future of the country ("On je isti kao on" compared Josip Broz Tito and Slobodan Milošević) and was, because of the political censorship, never released.

With the album Istorija, ti i ja (History, You and Me), released in 1991, the trilogy was complete. The album was produced by Valentino member Nikša Bratoš and featured the band's former keyboardist Saša Lokner, bass guitarist Slaviša Pavlović, flutist Bora Dugić and the group Renesans as guests. Istorija, ti i ja featured some of the band's biggest hits: "Skadarska" ("Skadarska Street"), "Trube" ("Trumpets"), "Da me nisi" ("If You Haven't"), "Trava" ("Grass") and "Seti se maja" ("Remember May"). Soon after the album release, Roskam left Yugoslavia because of the growing tensions in the country, and Dragutin Jakovljević "Guta" replaced him in Galija. On 11 June 1991 Galija performed as the opening band on Bob Dylan's concert on Zemun Stadium.

During 1991 the band released the compilation album Ni rat ni mir (Odlomci iz trilogije) (Neither War nor Peace (Passages from the Trilogy)), which consisted of songs from the trilogy, and two new songs "Pravo slavlje" ("Real Celebration", also a word play, as "Pravoslavlje" means "Orthodoxy" in Serbian) and "Na Drini ćuprija" ("The Bridge on the Drina", named after Ivo Andrić's novel). The 7-inch single with these two songs was given as a present to the audience on their concert in Sava Centar, which featured Fejat Sejdić Trumpet Orchestra, St. George Choir and pianist Miloš Petrović as guests. A year later, they held another concert in Sava Centar, as a part of celebration of the publishing house Srpska književna zadruga hundred years of existence. For this occasion, they recorded another gift-single, entitled Jednom u sto godina (Once in a Hundred Years), with a cover of Film song "Mi nismo sami" ("We Are Not Alone") and a cover of Indexi song "Sanjam" ("I'm Dreaming"), the latter cover featuring a recording of Ivo Andrić's voice. The band's guest on the concert was actress and singer Olivera Katarina, which was her first public appearance after many years she spent away from the public. At the beginning of 1993, Zlatković left the band. Oliver Jezdić became the new keyboard player, and Bratislav Milošević became the new bass guitarist.

In 1994 Galija released the double album Karavan (Caravan). The album was recorded in Cyprus and produced by Saša Habić. Part of the album lyrics were written by Kanjevac, and part by Predrag Milosavljević. The album featured Generacija 5 guitarist Dragan Jovanović on acoutic guitar as guest. The album featured a cover of traditional song "Petlovi" ("Roosters"). With Karavan Kanjevac ended his cooperation with the band.

1994–2000: after Kanjevac, without Predrag Milosavljević and hiatus

During the summer of 1994, Karavan was promoted with a large number of free open-air concerts held on city squares, one of them being a concert in the park outside Belgrade's Old Palace. The concerts were organized in cooperation with the ruling Socialist Party of Serbia, which has provoked a part of the critics and fans to proclaim Galija a "regime's band" and would influence the reception of their work in the years to follow.

In 1996 the album Trinaest (Thirteen) was released. Alongside Predrag Milosavljević's lyrics, Trinaest songs featured lyrics from Branko Radičević, Stevan Raičković and Petar Pajić's poems. During the next year, the band released the compilation album Večita plovidba (Eternal Sail), and the studio album Voleti voleti (To Love to Love), which featured the hit "Kotor". The album was recorded without Predrag Milosavljević and most of the lyrics for the album were written by Slobodan Kostadinović. In 1996 author Milan Kerković published the band's biography, entitled simply Galija.

The recording of the concert Galija held in Čair Hall in Niš on 8 March 1998 was released on the live album Ja jesam odavde (I Am From Around Here). On that evening the band performed in the following lineup: Nenad Milosavljević (acoustic guitar and vocals), Saša Ranđelović (guitar), Dragutin Jakovljević (guitar), Saša Lokner (keyboard), Boban Pavlović (drums) and Slaviša Pavlović (bass guitar). In 1999 the band released the album Južnjačka uteha (Southern Comfort) with covers of Serbian traditional songs. This album was also recorded without Predrag Milosavljević. The album was not followed by promotional concerts, and shortly after its release the band went on a hiatus.

2005–present

In 2005 the band returned to the scene with the album Dobro jutro, to sam ja (Good Morning, It's Me). The album was recorded in the lineup that featured Nenad and Predrag Milosavljević, Dragutin Jakovljević (guitar), Jan Vrba (keyboards), Boban Pavlović (drums) and Slaviša Pavlović (bass guitar). The album featured keyboardist Laza Ristovski and singers Aleksandra Kovač and Kristina Kovač as guests. The following year PGP-RTS released a best of compilation Najveći hitovi (Greatest Hits), featuring digitally remastered eighteen tracks spanning the band's whole career. In 2009, to celebrate 30 years since the release of their debut album, the band released a compilation album Oženiše me muzikom (They Got Me Married to Music), featuring a double compilation album consisting of 33 tracks recorded from 1979 until 1996, and a DVD entitled Kamera kao svedok (Camera as a Witness), with 19 videos the band recorded during the same period.

In October 2010 the band released the studio album, Mesto pored prozora (A Seat by the Window). The album title was selected out of four suggestions via fan e-mail poll. Videos for the songs "Zločin i kazna" ("Crime and Punishment"), which featured the actor Srđan Todorović, and "Čuvam ti mesto pored prozora" ("I'm Keeping a Seat by the Window for You") were directed by comics artist and film director Aleksa Gajić. In May 2011, Galija performed in Sarajevo for the first time after twenty years. The band celebrated thirty-five years of work with two concerts in Sava Centar, on 22 and 23 October 2011. The setlist consisted mostly of the band's ballads in new arrangements. The concerts featured numerous guests: the band's former member Jean Jacques Roskam, TV host Ivan Ivanović, actor Goran Sultanović, actress Sloboda Mićalović, traditional music singer Biljana Krstić, rock musician Kiki Lesendrić, pop musician Vlado Georgiev and actor Vuk Kostić.

In 2014, after the 2014 Serbian parliamentary election, Nenad Milosavljević became a deputy in the National Assembly of Serbia as a member of Socialist Party of Serbia. On 22 April 2016 the band performed, alongside Riblja Čorba, Van Gogh, Piloti and Električni Orgazam, on the opening of renovated Tašmajdan Stadium. The band celebrated their 40th anniversary with two concerts. The first one was a part of the festival 5 do 100 (5 to 100), which was held on 4 July 2016 on Niš Fortress. The festival featured Galija, the band Novembar, celebrating their 25th anniversary, and the band Van Gogh, celebrating their 30th anniversary (the combined "age" of the bands was 95, thus the title of the festival). The second concert was held in Belgrade's Sports Hall Ranko Žeravica on 29 December 2016. The concert featured Vreme Čuda as the opening band and the band's former members Aleksandar Ranđelović and Saša Lokner and Kerber frontman Goran Šepa as guests. Between two concerts, in November 2016, the band released the Celtic rock-oriented single "Nešto me goni" ("Something Makes Me Fight"), announcing their upcoming studio album.

The band's fourteenth studio album, entitled U raju iznad oblaka (In Heaven Above the Clouds), was released in May 2018. The album was produced by Saša Habić, with whom the Galija cooperated again after fourteen years and who also played keyboards on the album recording. It featured ten songs; lyrics for seven of them were written by Predrag Milosavljević. For the songs "Kad bi ti otišla iz ovog grada" ("I You Would Leave This Town"), "Voleo sam" ("I Used to Love") and "Don Ramiro" Nenad Milosavljević composed music on the lyrics of poets Matija Bećković, Pero Zubac and Milorad Mitrović respectively. The rock epic "Don Ramiro" was described by the critics as the band's return to their progressive rock roots. The album release was followed by promotional concerts; the concert in Niš was announced by the Milosavljević brothers unannounced unplugged performance in Niš's Obrenovićeva Street on 24 October 2018.

The band's former guitarist Jean Jacques Roskam died on 26 October 2020.

Legacy
Galija song "Intimni odnosi" was covered in 2011 by Serbian soul band Maraqya, on their album Savršen dan (Perfect Day).

In 2021 the album Karavan was polled 87th on the list of 100 Best Serbian Albums Since the Breakup of SFR Yugoslavia. The list was published in the book Kako (ni)je propao rokenrol u Srbiji (How Rock 'n' Roll in Serbia (Didn't) Came to an End).

In 2011, the song "Još uvek sanjam" was polled, by the listeners of Radio 202, one of 60 greatest songs released by PGP-RTB/PGP-RTS during the sixty years of the label's existence.

The lyrics of 12 songs by the band (1 written by Predrag Milosavljević, 10 written by Radoman Kanjevac and 1 written by Kanjevac and Bata Zlatković) were featured in Petar Janjatović's book Pesme bratstva, detinjstva & potomstva: Antologija ex YU rok poezije 1967 - 2007 (Songs of Brotherhood, Childhood & Offspring: Anthology of Ex YU Rock Poetry 1967 – 2007).

Discography

Prva plovidba (1979)
Druga plovidba (1980)
Ipak verujem u sebe (1982)
Bez naglih skokova (1984)
Digni ruku (1986)
Daleko je Sunce (1988)
Korak do slobode (1989)
Istorija, ti i ja (1991)
Karavan (1994)
Trinaest (1996)
Voleti voleti (1997)
Južnjačka uteha (1999)
Dobro jutro, to sam ja (2005)
Mesto pored prozora (2010)
U raju izdan oblaka (2018)

References

External links
Official website
Official YouTube channel
Galija at Discogs
Galija at Prog Archives

Serbian rock music groups
Serbian progressive rock groups
Serbian art rock groups
Serbian folk rock groups
Yugoslav rock music groups
Yugoslav progressive rock groups
Yugoslav art rock groups
Musical groups from Niš
Musical groups established in 1977